The  (Latin for "the philosophers' child", i.e. made by the true students of philosophy) is a symbol in alchemy. In some texts it is equated with the philosopher's stone, but in others it assumes its own symbolic meanings.

Among these are the transformed hermaphroditic Hermes, the child of the Red King and the White Queen (the Sun and Moon), the child of the egg, and the three-fathered Orion.

The  was also one of the Jungian archetypes analyzed by the Swiss psychologist.

References
 
 

Alchemical symbols